Warwick Ashley Davis (born 3 February 1970) is an English actor and television presenter. He played the title character in Willow (1988) and the Leprechaun film series (1993–2003), several characters in the Star Wars film series (1983–2019), most notably the Ewok Wicket, and Professor Filius Flitwick and the goblin Griphook in the Harry Potter film series (2001–2011). Davis starred as a fictionalised version of himself in the sitcom Life's Too Short (2011–2013). He has also presented the ITV game shows Celebrity Squares (2014–2015) and Tenable (2016–present).

Active within the industry since he was twelve, Davis is one of the highest grossing supporting actors of all time (excluding cameo appearances), owing predominantly to his appearances in the Star Wars and Harry Potter series of films.

Early life 
Davis was born on 3 February 1970 in Epsom, Surrey, the son of Susan J. ( Pain) and Ashley Davis, an insurance worker. He has a younger sister. He was educated at Chinthurst School in Tadworth, Surrey and later the City of London Freemen's School.

Davis was born with spondyloepiphyseal dysplasia congenita, a rare bone growth disorder that results in dwarfism. To Davis, who was a fan of the Star Wars films, it was a dream come true. During the filming of Return of the Jedi, Mark Hamill himself bought Davis every Star Wars action figure that he did not already own.

Career

Acting 

Davis was originally cast as an extra Ewok, but when Kenny Baker, who was originally going to be Wicket, fell ill, George Lucas picked Davis to be the new Wicket after seeing how he carried himself as an Ewok.

Davis based his Ewok movements on his dog, who tilted his head from side to side whenever he saw something strange. During production on the film, Davis was the subject of a short mockumentary film about his experience as Wicket, titled Return of the Ewok, made by Return of the Jedis first assistant director, David Tomblin. The unreleased film was a fictional look at his decision to become an actor and act in the film and his transformation into Wicket the Ewok. Davis reprised his role as Wicket in the ABC made-for-TV films Caravan of Courage: An Ewok Adventure and Ewoks: The Battle for Endor.

In 1987, Davis was called to Elstree Studios near London to meet with Ron Howard and George Lucas to discuss a new film project called Willow, which was written with Davis specifically in mind. Willow was his first opportunity to act with his face visible. He co-starred with Val Kilmer in the film, which received a Royal Premiere before the Prince and Princess of Wales. He then moved to television to be in the BBC Television adaptation of the classic The Chronicles of Narnia, specifically in Prince Caspian, The Voyage of the Dawn Treader (as Reepicheep), and The Silver Chair (as Glimfeather) and an episode of Zorro filmed in Madrid. In 1993, he played the villainous Irish lead character in Leprechaun, opposite Jennifer Aniston, a role he reprised in five sequels, from 1994 to 2003. He also played a leprechaun in the 1998 family film A Very Unlucky Leprechaun. Davis returned to the Star Wars universe, playing four roles in Star Wars: Episode I – The Phantom Menace: Weazel, a gambler sitting next to Watto at the Podrace; Wald, who was Anakin's Rodian friend, Yoda in some scenes where Yoda was seen walking, and finally, an extra seen walking around the streets of the city of Mos Espa.

Davis played the role of Professor Filius Flitwick in the Harry Potter film series. In addition to playing Flitwick, Davis played the role of the goblin Griphook in Harry Potter and the Deathly Hallows – Part 1 and Harry Potter and the Deathly Hallows – Part 2, despite the role being played previously by Verne Troyer.

In 2004, Davis played the character "Plates" in the indie film Skinned Deep, directed by special effects artist Gabriel Bartalos. In 2006, Davis appeared, alongside fellow Harry Potter star Daniel Radcliffe, in an episode of BBC's comedy series Extras as a satirical version of himself. Davis starred in the film version of The Hitchhiker's Guide to the Galaxy, as the "body" of Marvin the Paranoid Android (the voice was provided by Alan Rickman). In December 2006, Davis starred in the pantomime Snow White and the Seven Dwarves at the Opera House, Manchester, and again in 2007–08 at the New Wimbledon Theatre.

Davis appeared in The Chronicles of Narnia: Prince Caspian, in which he played Nikabrik the Dwarf, adding to his previous involvement in TV adaptations of the Chronicles of Narnia series. He also appeared as a contestant on the 2007 series of Children in Need reality show Celebrity Scissorhands. Davis starred as a fictional version of himself in Life's Too Short, written by Ricky Gervais and Stephen Merchant, who also starred. In December 2012, Davis returned to New Wimbledon Theatre to reprise his role in Snow White and the Seven Dwarfs.

Davis also appeared in the 2008 TV series Merlin as the character Grettir, the gatekeeper to the "lands of king fisher" in the episode "The Eye of the Phoenix" in Series 3.

In March 2013, Davis presented an episode of the ITV series Perspectives: "Warwick Davis – The Seven Dwarfs of Auschwitz", in which he explored the story of the Ovitz family, a touring musical troupe which included seven dwarfs who survived the Nazi Auschwitz concentration camp and the experiments of Josef Mengele.

Davis appeared as the character Porridge in the Doctor Who episode "Nightmare in Silver", first broadcast in May 2013.

In late 2013, Davis appeared for one month as Patsy in the musical comedy Spamalot, based on the film Monty Python and the Holy Grail in London. At the same time, Davis hosted a press conference to announce the Monty Python reunion.

In 2014, Davis hosted a factual series for ITV called Weekend Escapes with Warwick Davis. The show saw Davis and his family travelling around Britain, enjoying short weekend holiday breaks. The show returned for a second series in spring 2015. From 2014 to 2015, he hosted the revived version of game show Celebrity Squares on ITV. The first series was shown in 2014 and a second aired in 2015.

Davis appeared in the 2015 sequel Star Wars: The Force Awakens. In July 2015, he became the voice of Gordon the Gopher in a pilot developed for BBC Taster, and the pilot progressed well, becoming one of the highest rated on the BBC's Taster section.

In November 2016, Davis began presenting the daytime ITV game show Tenable. The show returned for further series in 2017 and 2018. Davis also appeared in Rogue One: A Star Wars Story, released December 2016, as the rebel fighter Weeteef Cyubee and that was also his first Star Wars role with a blaster. In April 2017, at Star Wars Celebration Orlando, it was announced that Davis would voice Grand Admiral Thrawn's bodyguard Ruhk in the fourth season of Star Wars Rebels. In December 2017, Davis appeared as Wodibin, an alien gambler, in Star Wars: The Last Jedi. Davis appeared in the film Solo: A Star Wars Story, released in May 2018, reuniting with his Willow director Ron Howard. This was Davis' eighth appearance in a Star Wars film. In the film, Davis reprised his role of Weazel from The Phantom Menace. Davis also briefly appeared in Star Wars: The Rise of Skywalker, reprising his role of Wicket. He appeared in the role alongside his son Harrison, who also cameoed as Wicket's son Pommet.

Davis reprised his role as Willow Ufgood in the Disney+ series Willow to generally positive critic reviews.

Star Wars characters
Davis plays Wicket in four films and Weazel in two films; all fifteen of Warwick Davis' Star Wars characters break down as such:

Other projects 
In 1995, Davis co-founded, with fellow actor and father-in-law Peter Burroughs, the talent agency Willow Management, that specialises in representing actors under five feet (1.52 m) tall. Many of Davis's co-stars and fellow actors with dwarfism from Star Wars, Willow, Labyrinth and the Harry Potter series are represented by the agency. In 2004, the agency also began representing actors over seven feet (2.13 m) tall who had suffered from being confined to "niche" roles. Over forty members of Willow Management were cast as goblins in Harry Potter and the Deathly Hallows – Part 2.

In April 2010, Davis published his autobiography, Size Matters Not: The Extraordinary Life and Career of Warwick Davis, with a foreword by George Lucas.

In October 2012, Davis appeared in a set of videos with the popular YouTube group The Yogscast, after the hosts of the yogscast's podcast "The YogPod" discussed him in several episodes. In January 2013, he appeared in a Comic Relief episode of The Great British Bake Off, winning that episode's title of "Comic Relief Star Baker".

Davis is a founder of the Reduced Height Theatre Company, which stages theatrical productions cast exclusively with short actors and using reduced height sets. Their first production was See How They Run, touring the UK in 2014. In February 2015, the production was the subject of the BBC's "Warwick Davis' Big Night" as part of the Modern Times documentary series.

On 15 July 2014, Davis appeared on stage with Monty Python during their live show Monty Python Live (Mostly). He was the special guest in their "Blackmail" sketch. In June 2016, he was the castaway on the BBC Radio 4 programme Desert Island Discs.

Davis produced a new original musical Eugenius! by Ben Adams and Chris Wilkins, which premiered as a concert performance on 29 June 2016 at the London Palladium (which Davis also starred in as Evil Lord Hector) followed by fully staged runs at The Other Palace in 2018.

In February 2017 the BBC broadcast an episode of the genealogy programme Who Do You Think You Are? about Davis. In the episode Davis learned that in his family tree he had an ancestor that had been married to two women at the same time, another who had died in an asylum from syphilis and another who performed at minstrel shows in blackface.

Personal life 

Davis is married to Samantha (née Burroughs), the daughter of Davis' business partner Peter Burroughs and the sister of actress Hayley Burroughs. Davis met the Burroughs family while filming Willow, where Samantha and Peter had minor roles as Nelwyn villagers. They have two children. Their daughter, Annabelle Davis, stars in the CBBC show The Dumping Ground as Sasha Bellman.

Unlike most people with dwarfism who have a condition called achondroplasia (70.65%), Davis' dwarfism is caused by an extremely rare genetic condition called spondyloepiphyseal dysplasia congenita (SED). Davis' wife, Samantha, has achondroplasia, and their two children have SED. As a result of inheriting both conditions, the couple's first son, Lloyd, died nine days after birth. A later attempt at conceiving a child resulted in a second trimester miscarriage.

Davis has said the only real drawback to being small was the associated health problems. Of his own dwarfism, Davis has said, "Well, as you get older, it gets worse... Your joints, for a start. My hips are dislocated, so they're sitting out here. Very painful knees. I had surgery on my feet when I was very young. There's a risk of retinal detachment, but I know the signs now."

Davis is co-founder of Little People UK, a charity that provides support to people with dwarfism and their families.

Filmography

Notes

References

External links 

Willow Management

1970 births
20th-century English male actors
21st-century English male actors
Actors with dwarfism
English male child actors
English male film actors
English male stage actors
English male television actors
English game show hosts
English television presenters
Living people
Male actors from Surrey
People educated at City of London Freemen's School
People from Epsom
People educated at Chinthurst School
Television presenters with disabilities